Spen may refer to:

SPEN, human gene
Spen, West Yorkshire, a location in England
River Spen, river in West Yorkshire, England, the United Kingdom
SS Spen, British steamship built in 1908
Spen Whittaker (1871–1910), English football manager

See also
S Pen, stylus pen for Samsung smartphones